Tahmasb Qoli (also Romanized as Ţahmāsb Qolī and Ţahmāseb Qolī; also known as Ţahmāsb Qal‘eh and Tehmasp Qulleh) is a village in Howmeh-ye Dehgolan Rural District, in the Central District of Dehgolan County, Kurdistan Province, Iran. At the 2006 census, its population was 316, in 75 families. The village is populated by Kurds.

References 

Towns and villages in Dehgolan County
Kurdish settlements in Kurdistan Province